Mofidul Hoque (born 13 February 1948) is a Bangladeshi researcher, publisher and essayist. He is one of the founder trustees of the Bangladesh Liberation War Museum.

Early life
Mofidul Hoque was born on 13 February 1948 in Noakhali of the then East Bengal (now Bangladesh). He obtained his MA degree in sociology from the University of Dhaka. He is married to Sheema Moslem in his personal life.

Awards
 Bangla Academy Literary Award (2013) for essays
 Ekushey Padak (2016)
 Shaheed Altaf Mahmud Medal

References

1948 births
Recipients of the Ekushey Padak
People from Noakhali District
Living people
Recipients of Bangla Academy Award